The Danish physician Wilhelm Meyer (1824–1895) was the first to describe the clinical condition of nasal obstruction (blocked nose) with chronic mouth breathing, snoring, dull facial expression, and hearing impairment due to adenoid hypertrophy.

Likewise he suggested how to treat the condition surgically by removing the adenoids with an  adenotome. Adenoidectomy is still one of the most frequently performed surgical procedures in children.

References
Kierzek A. The hypertrophy of pharyngeal tonsil in the estimation of XIX-century physicians. Otolaryngol Pol. 2005;59(5):777-85.
Feldmann H. The nasopharynx and pharyngeal tonsil in the history of otology and rhinology. Pictures from the history of otorhinolaryngology, presented by instruments from the collection of the Ingolstadt Medical History Museum. Laryngorhinootologie. 1999 May;78(5):280-9.
Semon F. Speech made at the unveiling of the Wilhelm Meyer monument, at Copenhagen. Laryngoscope. 1997 Mar;107(3):307-9.

1824 births
1895 deaths
Danish surgeons
Otolaryngologists
Burials at Isola di San Michele